WDIH (90.3 FM) is a radio station broadcasting an urban gospel format. Licensed to Salisbury, Maryland, United States, the station is currently owned by the Salisbury Educational Broadcasting Foundation.

External links

DIH
Radio stations established in 1970
1970 establishments in Maryland